Milan Kadlec (3 December 1958 – 24 August 2001) was a Czech modern pentathlete. He competed at the 1980 and 1988 Summer Olympics.

References

1958 births
2001 deaths
Czech male modern pentathletes
Olympic modern pentathletes of Czechoslovakia
Czechoslovak male modern pentathletes
Modern pentathletes at the 1980 Summer Olympics
Modern pentathletes at the 1988 Summer Olympics
Sportspeople from Kladno
Suicides by hanging in the Czech Republic